Nikita Glasnović (born 17 January 1995) is a Swedish-born Croatian taekwondo practitioner. She represented Sweden at the 2016 Summer Olympics in the 57 kg division, and lost a bronze medal match to Kimia Alizadeh.

Nikita and her younger brother Leon train at the Toigye Taekwondo Club in Malmö, which is run by their father, Mario Glasnovic; she took up taekwondo aged four. She is named after the lead character in Luc Besson's movie La Femme Nikita, and her brother received his name after the protagonist of Léon: The Professional. In 2011, she was selected as Malmö Most Promising Female Athlete of the Year and in 2015 as the Malmö Female Athlete of the Year. She failed to qualify for the 2016 Olympics by a one point at the 2015 Grand Prix final, where she finished fourth, yet she was invited to the Olympics after withdrawal of one of the competitors, Huang Yun-wen. She studied media and communications at Lund University in 2014–15, and rhetorics at Linnaeus University in 2015. In 2016, she enrolled to the art history program at Umea University and to courses in Bosnian, Serbian and Croatian languages and literature at Uppsala University.

References

External links

1995 births
Living people
Swedish people of Croatian descent
Swedish female taekwondo practitioners
Olympic taekwondo practitioners of Sweden
Taekwondo practitioners at the 2016 Summer Olympics
Universiade medalists in taekwondo
Mediterranean Games bronze medalists for Croatia
Mediterranean Games medalists in taekwondo
Competitors at the 2018 Mediterranean Games
Universiade bronze medalists for Sweden
Taekwondo practitioners at the 2015 European Games
European Games medalists in taekwondo
European Games bronze medalists for Sweden
World Taekwondo Championships medalists
European Taekwondo Championships medalists
Medalists at the 2015 Summer Universiade
Sportspeople from Malmö